Cormons or Cormòns is a comune (municipality) in  the Italian region Friuli-Venezia Giulia, located about  northwest of Trieste and about  west of Gorizia, on the border with Slovenia.  
  
Cormons borders the following municipalities: Brda (Slovenia), Capriva del Friuli, Chiopris-Viscone, Corno di Rosazzo, Dolegna del Collio, Mariano del Friuli, Medea, Moraro, San Floriano del Collio, San Giovanni al Natisone.

Demographics
According to the Italian census of 1971, 4.4% of the population was of Slovene ethnicity.

People
Denis Godeas
Sergio Marcon
Valentino Pittoni
Peter Cormons
Stephan Villavicencio
Marco Gribaudo - Guitar Player, Doobies & Cheesecake

Transport
Cormons railway station is served by trains to Trieste, Udine, Treviso and Venice.

References

External links

 Official website
 Cormons live streaming webcam

Cities and towns in Friuli-Venezia Giulia